NGC 4638 is an edge-on lenticular galaxy located about 50 million light-years away in the constellation Virgo. NGC 4638 was discovered by astronomer William Herschel on March 15, 1784. The galaxy is a member of the Virgo Cluster.

Structure 
At the center of NGC 4638, there is a small bulge. There is also an edge-on disk and a diffuse, boxy halo. The shallow surface brightness gradient of the halo is characteristic of a large spheroidal galaxy. This means that NGC 4638 has properties of both S0 and Sph galaxies.

See also
 List of NGC objects (4001–5000)

References

External links

Virgo (constellation)
Lenticular galaxies
4638
42728
7880
Astronomical objects discovered in 1784
Virgo Cluster